Steven Price (born 22 April 1977) is a British film composer, best known for scoring Gravity, which won him the Academy Award for Best Original Score. Before making his debut as a composer with Attack the Block, he worked on the music department for various notable films, such as The Lord of the Rings: The Two Towers, The Lord of the Rings: The Return of the King, Batman Begins, and Scott Pilgrim vs. the World.

Life and career

Price's passion for music began early: a guitarist from the age of five, he went on to achieve a First Class degree in Music from Emmanuel College, Cambridge. Following graduation, he went to work in the London studio of Gang of Four guitarist/producer Andy Gill, for whom he would program, contribute string arrangements, and play on albums alongside artists such as Michael Hutchence and Bono.

Price went on to work as a programmer, arranger, and performer with film music composer Trevor Jones. He provided additional music for projects such as Roger Donaldson's Thirteen Days; Stephen Norrington's The League of Extraordinary Gentlemen; Frank Coraci's Around the World in 80 Days; the television series Dinotopia; and Tamra Davis' Crossroads, on which he was also the featured guitar soloist with the London Symphony Orchestra.

A recommendation from Abbey Road Studios brought him to the attention of Howard Shore, leading to Price's work with the composer as music editor on Peter Jackson The Lord of the Rings film trilogy. His subsequent films as music editor included Christopher Nolan's Batman Begins, for which he shared with his fellow music editors a Golden Reel Award nomination; and, in his first project with The World's End director Edgar Wright, Scott Pilgrim vs. the World, on which he also collaborated with the film's composer Nigel Godrich. Among the other composers that he has worked with and learned from are Hans Zimmer, James Newton Howard, Harry and Rupert Gregson-Williams, George Fenton, Dario Marianelli, and Anne Dudley.

He has composed music for advertising campaigns in both the U.K. and U.S. After contributing additional music to Richard Curtis' Pirate Radio, he composed the original score for Joe Cornish's sleeper success Attack the Block, winning awards from both the Austin Film Critics Association and the Sitges - Catalan International Film Festival.

In 2013, Price composed the score for Alfonso Cuarón's Gravity, for which he won the Academy Award for Best Original Score.

Discography

Films

Television

Music department

Trojan Eddie (1996)
The Proposition (1998)
Doomwatch: Winter Angel (1999)
Crossroads (2002)
The Lord of the Rings: The Two Towers (2002)
A Man Apart (2003)
I'll Be There (2003)
The League of Extraordinary Gentlemen (2003)
The Lord of the Rings: The Return of the King (2003)
Belly of the Beast (2003)
Gladiatress (2004)
Around the World in 80 Days (2004)
Batman Begins (2005)
Stoned (2005)
Opal Dream (2006)
Driving Lessons (2006)
Perfect Creature (2006)
After Thomas (2006)
Mr. Bean's Holiday (2007)
The Last Legion (2007)
Earth (2007)
I'm Not There (2007)
Made of Honor (2008)
Wild Child (2008)
The Meerkats (2008)
Frequently Asked Questions About Time Travel (2009)
Pirate Radio (2009)
Nanny McPhee Returns (2010)
Scott Pilgrim vs. the World (2010)
Paul (2011)
Johnny English Reborn (2011)
Marley (2012)
Baby Driver (2017)

Awards and honours
In December 2013, the Dallas–Fort Worth Film Critics Association awarded him the Best Musical Score honor for his work on Gravity.

Accolades

References

External links
 

1977 births
Alumni of Emmanuel College, Cambridge
Animation composers
Best Original Music BAFTA Award winners
Best Original Music Score Academy Award winners
English film score composers
English male film score composers
English television composers
Male television composers
Living people
People from Nottingham